Aspiration is a compilation album by American composer Bill Laswell, released on March 15, 2011 by Metastation.

Track listing

Personnel 
Adapted from the Aspiration liner notes.
Musicians
Jeff Bova – synthesizer (4)
Bootsy Collins – bass guitar (4)
Alice Coltrane – piano and harp (2), musical arrangements (2)
Sussan Deyhim – vocals (3), musical arrangements (3)
Aïyb Dieng – Ghatam, congas and percussion (4)
Kudsi Erguner – ney (3)
Jonas Hellborg – bass guitar (4)
The Dalai Lama – voice (5)
Zakir Hussain – tabla (1)
K. Pattabhi Jois – chant (1)
Toshinori Kondo – trumpet and electronics (5)
Bill Laswell – bass guitar (1, 3, 4, 5), percussion (6), remix (2), producer
Nils Petter Molvær – trumpet (1)
Mark Nauseef – meditation bells (3)
Pharoah Sanders – tenor saxophone (6)
Carlos Santana – guitar (2)
Simon Shaheen – oud and violin (4)
Nicky Skopelitis – guitar, sitar and baglama (4), percussion (6)
Bernie Worrell – electric piano and organ (4)
Technical personnel
James Dellatacoma – assistant engineering
Michael Fossenkemper – mastering
Russell Mills – cover art
Robert Musso – engineering

Release history

References

External links 
 Aspiration at Discogs (list of releases)

1996 compilation albums
Bill Laswell compilation albums
Albums produced by Bill Laswell